Yang Guanghua or Guang-Hwa Yang (1923–2006), was a Chinese chemist and chemical engineer. He was the President of China University of Petroleum, and a pioneer of China's oil industry.

Biography 
Yang was born in Liuyang, Hunan, on 10 April 1923. In 1945, he graduated from the Department of Chemical Engineering of Zhejiang University in Hangzhou. He was a teaching assistant in the same department. In 1948, Yang went to study in the United States, and obtained his Doctor of Engineering degree from the University of Wisconsin–Madison in 1951. 

Yang went back to China in May 1951. Yang was a professor at Peking University and Tsinghua University. In 1953, Yang joined to found the Beijing Petroleum College (北京石油学院; predecessor of current China University of Petroleum). In 1956, Yang was a visiting researcher at Moscow Petroleum Institute, USSR. In 1965, Yang was pointed Vice-president of Beijing Petroleum College. After 1969, Yang was Vice-president, later President of East China Petroleum College. From 1988 to 1992, Yang was the President of China University of Petroleum (CUP), a national key university. Yang died in Beijing on 11 November 2006 at age 83. Yang donated his books and academic collections to the library of CUP.

In 1950s, Yang and Prof. Wu Chi co-founded the first educational program of oil and natural gas engineering/refining in China.

Yang's son Yang Wei, a mechanical engineer, served as President of Zhejiang University.

Honors 
Asteroid 10410 Yangguanghua, discovered by the Beijing Schmidt CCD Asteroid Program in 1997, is named in his memory. The official  was published by the Minor Planet Center on 26 October 2018.

References

External links 
 Yang Guanghua's detailed biography from the China State Key Laboratory of Heavy Oil
 Notable People from Liuyang - Yang Guanghua
 Pioneer of China's Oil Industry - Prof. YANG Guanghua

1923 births
2006 deaths
Chemists from Hunan
Academic staff of China University of Petroleum
Chinese chemical engineers
Educators from Hunan
Engineers from Hunan
Academic staff of Peking University
People from Changsha
Academic staff of Tsinghua University
University of Wisconsin–Madison College of Engineering alumni
Zhejiang University alumni